Alapadu is a village in Eluru Dist of the Indian state of Andhra Pradesh. It is located in Kaikaluru mandal of Eluru revenue division.

References

Villages in Krishna district